Georg Wurzer (31 January 1907 – 8 August 1982) was a German football manager. He managed VfB Stuttgart from 1947 to 1960. He also managed FC Zürich, SSV Reutlingen and Stuttgarter Kickers.

References

External links

1907 births
1982 deaths
Footballers from Munich
German footballers
German football managers
VfB Stuttgart managers
FC Zürich managers
Stuttgarter Kickers managers
Association football midfielders
West German football managers
West German expatriate football managers
Expatriate football managers in Switzerland
West German expatriate sportspeople in Switzerland